Subramaniya Siva (Tamil: சுப்பிரமணிய சிவா) (4 October 1884 – 23 July 1925) was an Indian freedom fighter, writer and pure Tamil movement activist during the Indian independence movement.

Life
Subramaniya Siva was born in a Brahmin Iyer family to Veersaiva Iyer at Vatlagundu near Dindigul in erstwhile Madurai district of Madras presidency. He was born to Rajam Iyer. He joined the Indian freedom movement in 1908.

While serving a prison term, he was afflicted by leprosy and was shifted to Salem jail. Since leprosy was regarded as a contagious disease, the British authorities forbade him to travel by rail after his release and hence he was forced to travel on foot. He continued to fight for independence and was incarcerated many times until 1922. He was the author of the journal Gnanabhanu and books Ramanuja Vijayam and Madhva Vijayam.

He eventually succumbed to leprosy on 23 July 1925.

Pure Tamil Movement
A movement started by Maraimalai Adigal, the Thanittamil (‘pure Tamil’) literary movement intended to rid the Tamil language of non-Tamil words. The movement was supported & propagated by Subramaniya Siva and is one of the most significant of all Tamil revivalist movements organised by nationalists.

His passion for Tamil was such that he wrote an advertisement which was published in Gnanabhanu as:

"Five rupees — Can you write pure Tamil? If so, rush in. A lover of Tamil has come forward to offer five rupees (as a prize) for anyone who writes, not less than eight pages on the history of Tiruvalluvar in our Gnanabhanu, which uses only pure Tamil words with no mixtures of words from other languages like Sanskrit.”

Honours
The office of Dindigul district collector is named after as Thiyagi Subramania Siva Maaligai after him. Bathlagundu bus stand is named after Siva. A memorial has been established at Papparapatti near Pennagaram in Dharmapuri district.

References 

1884 births
1925 deaths
People from Dindigul district
Indian independence activists from Tamil Nadu